Lieutenant Colonel George Mitchell DSO (1877–1939) was an Independent Liberal Member of Parliament for  in New Zealand. He also served with the New Zealand Military Forces in the Boer War and the First World War.

Early life
George Mitchell was born in Balclutha in 1877.  He was a member of the Balclutha Mounted Rifles in 1898.

Military service

Boer War
Mitchell served with the 1st and 8th New Zealand Contingents in South Africa 1899–1902. Mitchell was awarded the Queen's South Africa Medal with relief of Kimberley, Paardeberg, Driefontein, Transvaal and South Africa 1902 Clasps.

First World War
Following the outbreak of the First World War, Mitchell volunteered for the 1st New Zealand Expeditionary Force for service aboard. He was a major in the Southland Regiment and commanding officer of the 3rd Otago Reserve Battalion from 1917 to 1919, reaching the rank of lieutenant colonel. Mitchell saw action in Gallipoli and France. He received the DSO in 1918 for distinguished service in the field (France and Flanders). He was awarded the Serbian Order of Karageorge, 4th Class with Swords; 1914-1915 Star; British War Medal; Victory Medal; Colonial Auxiliary Forces Long Service Medal; and NZ Volunteer Service Medal.

Mitchell was also the officer in charge of conscientious objector Archibald Baxter and responsible for punishing him with Field Punishment No.1.

Political career

After the end of his parliamentary career, Mitchell served on the Wellington City Council for two periods, from 1923 to 1925 and again from 1927 to 1931. He also served on the Wellington Harbour Board from 1921 to 1929 serving as its chair from 1923 to 1925.

Later life
He was the President of the Returned Soldiers' Association (RSA), an executive member of the War Relief Association and sat on the Wellington College Board of Governors.

Mitchell died 16 March 1939 in Wellington in a private hospital, aged 62. He was survived by his second wife, and five children from his first marriage. He was buried at Karori Cemetery.

Notes

References

 

1877 births
1939 deaths
Independent MPs of New Zealand
New Zealand Liberal Party MPs
Wellington City Councillors
New Zealand Companions of the Distinguished Service Order
New Zealand military personnel of the Second Boer War
New Zealand military personnel of World War I
Burials at Karori Cemetery
Unsuccessful candidates in the 1922 New Zealand general election
Members of the New Zealand House of Representatives
New Zealand MPs for Wellington electorates
People from Balclutha, New Zealand
Wellington Harbour Board members